Daniel Talbot (born 30 January 1984) is an English footballer who plays for Southern League Premier Division side Dunstable Town, where he plays as a midfielder.

He played in the Football League for Rushden & Diamonds before dropping into non-league football. His father is Brian Talbot.

References

1984 births
Living people
English footballers
Rushden & Diamonds F.C. players
Cambridge City F.C. players
Potters Bar Town F.C. players
Chesham United F.C. players
Hemel Hempstead Town F.C. players
Hitchin Town F.C. players
Dunstable Town F.C. players
English Football League players
Association football midfielders